Adrian Foster is a Canadian politician who serves as the current mayor of Clarington. As mayor, he also sits on Durham Regional Council.

Education 
Foster was educated at the University of Toronto Scarborough, where he studied psychology and French, and received a Bachelors of Arts degree in 1983. After graduating, he worked as a counsellor for developmentally disabled children and their families. He then worked as an investment advisor for 26 years. He also served as the President of the Clarington Board of Trade. He was awarded with the Queen Elizabeth II Golden Jubilee Medal in 2002 and the Queen Elizabeth II Diamond Jubilee Medal in 2012.

Political career 
Foster first entered politics upon being elected to Clarington's municipal council in 2003, defeating Suzanne Elston by just over 200 votes in Ward 1. He was re-elected to council in 2006, winning two-thirds of the vote against Oudit Rai. He ran on the need for a "central defining feature" for the ward's main community of Courtice, and the need to "get a handle on the planning of the Highway 2 corridor".

Foster was first elected as Clarington's mayor in the 2010 municipal elections, defeating incumbent mayor Jim Abernethy by fewer than 900 votes, in a close three-way race. He campaigned promising "working together for a change", and his number one priority was preventing the construction of a garbage incinerator in the municipality. He was re-elected in 2014 in a close race against former Progressive Conservative MPP John O'Toole, the father of future Conservative Party leader Erin O'Toole. Foster's priorities in 2014 included expanding Go Transit, job creation, bettering quality of life, and developing deeper relationships with other levels of government. Foster was easily re-elected for a third term in 2018, winning over two-thirds of the vote against Mark Canning. His priorities have been trying to extend the GO Train to the municipality, renovating Lakeridge Health Bowmanville and building a hospice in Newcastle. In 2022, he was re-elected for his fourth term, with 42% of the vote.  As of 2022, Foster is the longest serving Mayor of Clarington, surpassing 12 years in office.

As mayor, he has sat as the chair of Durham Region Finance, and as the Chair of the Canadian Association of Nuclear Host Communities. During his time as mayor, he has led the municipality though rapid growth.

Personal life
Foster's wife, Deborah is an ordained United Church of Canada minister.

Electoral record

References

Living people
University of Toronto alumni
Mayors of places in Ontario
Financial advisors
People from Clarington
Year of birth missing (living people)